Mihail Kogălniceanu Airport  is situated in southeastern Romania, in the commune of Mihail Kogălniceanu,  north-northwest of Constanța. It is the main airport of the Northern Dobruja region and provides access to Constanța County, the Port of Constanța and the Black Sea resorts. The airport is named in honour of Mihail Kogălniceanu, the third Prime Minister of Romania.

The military sector of the Mihail Kogălniceanu International Airport is currently home of the 57th Air Base. Since 1999 it has occasionally been used by the United States Air Force.

History
Built in 1955 as a military airbase, Mihail Kogălniceanu Airport opened for civil operations in May 1960. It replaced the old Palas Airport (founded in 1932).

A passenger terminal with a capacity of 200 passengers per hour was inaugurated in 1962. In 1967 the terminal expanded to a processing capacity of 300 pax/hour. In 1974 a major expansion increased the processing capacity to 1,000 pax/hour.

Use of the airport peaked at 778,766 passengers in 1979, when foreign tourism to the Romanian Riviera was at a high. Mihail Kogălniceanu International Airport handled 127,635 passengers in 2017. That represented a 34.9% increase over the previous year.

Airlines and destinations
The following airlines operate regular scheduled and charter flights at Constanța Airport:

Statistics

Traffic figures

Military usage

The airport is home of the Romanian Air Force 57th Air Base, which was the only unit operating the Mikoyan MiG-29 fighter aircraft. The base was disbanded in April 2004. All the 18 MiG-29s remain in open storage at the airport. It has been used by the US Military since 1999. 

It is currently home to the 572nd Helicopter Squadron which operates IAR 330Ls and also hosts the 861st Fighter Squadron of the 86th Air Base which operates MiG-21 LanceRs.

Ground transportation

Bus
Several city bus lines link the airport to Constanța railway station. There are also a few private bus lines operating to downtown Constanța and to the Romanian Black Sea resorts. There is no shuttle service available.

Taxi
There are always cabs available outside airport terminal. The cost of a ride to Constanța is around US$30 which is considerably higher than the bus rates which can be as low as 3 lei/US$0,43.

Car
The Airport is easily accessible by car and is located in north-western part of Constanța, which can be accessed from the DN 2A/E60 Constanța-Hârșova or A4 motorway (Romania) until Ovidiu.
The airport can also be reached from the A2 highway by exiting towards Cernavodă driving on DN22C towards Medgidia then through county road DJ 222 passing through Cuza Vodă all the way to the commune of Mihail Kogălniceanu where the airport is located. 

Alternatively from the A2 highway there is another exit towards Medgidia on DJ381 and then continue on DJ222. Car rentals are also available. There is free short- and long-term parking right outside the airport terminal.

Accidents and incidents
 On 12 June 2017, a MiG-21 LanceR of the Romanian Air Force crashed on approach, 8 km away from Mihail Kogălniceanu Airport. The pilot, though seriously injured, survived and the aircraft was written off.

See also
 Aviation in Romania
 Transport in Romania

Notes

References
 Charlie Coon, Construction To Begin This Winter On Romania Bases, Stars and Stripes, September 30, 2006
 JTF East

External links

 Official website
 Google Map - Aerial View
 Sourcewatch link
 

Airports in Romania
Romania–United States military relations
Black sites
Buildings and structures in Constanța County
Airports established in 1960
1960 establishments in Romania
Transport in Constanța